Aushapur is a village in Medchal–Malkajgiri district in Telangana, India. It falls under Ghatkesar Mandal.

References

Villages in Ranga Reddy district